Gardner is a census-designated place (CDP) and post office in and governed by Huerfano County, Colorado, United States. The Gardner post office has the ZIP Code 81040. At the United States Census 2020, the population of the Gardner CDP was 106.

History
The Gardner Post Office has been in operation since 1871. The community has the name of Herbert Gardner, a local pioneer. Herbert was the son of Henry Gardner.

Geography

Demographics

See also

 List of census-designated places in Colorado

References

External links

 Gardner @ Sangres.com
 Gardner, Colorado Mining Claims And Mines
 Huerfano County website

Census-designated places in Huerfano County, Colorado
Census-designated places in Colorado